Chalabi may refer to:

Chalabi, Armenia, a town
Chalabi, Iran (disambiguation), various locations
Chalabi (surname), including a list of people with the surname 
Chalabi Jews, Jews originating from Aleppo, also known as Halabi Jews

See also

Çelebi (disambiguation)
Eugenio Calabi (born 1923), an Italian-born American mathematician